Sir Henry Erskine, 5th Baronet (23 Dec 1710 – 7 August 1765) was a Scottish soldier and politician.

He was a younger son of Sir John Erskine, 3rd Baronet, M.P. of Alva, Clackmannanshire, and Catherine Sinclair, was probably educated at Eton College and entered Lincoln's Inn to study law in 1728. However, instead of a legal career he joined the Army and rose to the rank of Lieutenant-General in 1765.

He succeeded to the baronetcy and family estate when his elder brother Charles was killed in action at the Battle of Lauffeld in 1747. Erskine then served as Member of Parliament (MP) for Ayr Burghs 1749–1754 and for Anstruther Easter Burghs 1754–1765.

He died in 1765. He had married Janet, the daughter of Peter Wedderburn, Lord Chesterhall, and with her had two sons and a daughter. He was succeeded by his eldest son James, who later became the 2nd Earl of Rosslyn.

References

1710s births
1765 deaths
Members of Lincoln's Inn
Baronets in the Baronetage of Nova Scotia
Members of the Parliament of Great Britain for Scottish constituencies
British MPs 1747–1754
British MPs 1754–1761
British MPs 1761–1768
67th Regiment of Foot officers
King's Own Scottish Borderers officers
Royal Scots officers
Henry